Ligustrum obtusifolium (border privet or Amur privet) is a species of privet, native to Japan, Korea and northeastern China (Heilongjiang, Jiangsu, Liaoning, Shandong, Zhejiang). The species is considered invasive in parts of the United States. It has become very common in southern New England, the mid-Atlantic States, and the Great Lakes regions, with scattered occurrences in the South, the Great Plains, and Washington state. With Ligustrum ovalifolium it is a parent of the widespread hybrid Ligustrum × ibolium.

There are three subspecies:
Ligustrum obtusifolium subsp. obtusifolium. Japan.
Ligustrum obtusifolium subsp. microphyllum (Nakai) P.S.Green. Eastern China, Korea, Japan.
Ligustrum obtusifolium subsp. suave (Kitagawa) Kitagawa. Northeastern China.

Etymology
Ligustrum means ‘binder’. It was named by Pliny and Virgil.

References

obtusifolium
Flora of China
Flora of Heilongjiang
Flora of Jiangsu
Flora of Liaoning
Flora of Shandong
Flora of Zhejiang
Plants described in 1846